Mount Hungabee, officially Hungabee Mountain, is a mountain located on the boundaries of Banff National Park and Yoho National Park on the Continental Divide at the head of Paradise Valley, in Canada. The peak was named in 1894 by Samuel Allen after the Stoney Indian (also known as Nakoda) word for "chieftain" as the mountain is higher than its neighbouring peaks. The mountain can be seen from the Icefields Parkway (#93) in the upper Bow Valley.

Climbing 
History
Mt. Hungabee was first climbed in 1903 by H.C. Parker who was guided by Hans Kaufmann and Christian Kaufmann.

Routes
The normal climbing route is via the west ridge (III 5.4) which features route finding challenges. Early summer is not recommended due to avalanche hazard from snow on the NW face.

Geology

Mount Hungabee is composed of sedimentary rock laid down during the Precambrian to Jurassic periods. Formed in shallow seas, this sedimentary rock was pushed east and over the top of younger rock during the Laramide orogeny.

Climate

Based on the Köppen climate classification, Mount Hungabee is located in a subarctic climate zone with cold, snowy winters, and mild summers. Winter temperatures can drop below −20 °C with wind chill factors below −30 °C.

Gallery

See also 
 List of peaks on the Alberta–British Columbia border

References

Further reading

External links

Mountains of Banff National Park
Three-thousanders of Alberta
Three-thousanders of British Columbia
Mountains of Yoho National Park
Borders of British Columbia
Borders of Alberta
Canadian Rockies
Great Divide of North America